Mampato is a Chilean adventure and science fiction comic strip.

Mampato may also refer to:
 Mampato, the protagonist of the comic strip
 , a Chilean children's magazine
 Mampato (El Mercurio), a supplement of El Mercurio
  or Mampato, a Chilean breed of pony